Kevin Gareth Lloyd (born 26 September 1970) is a Welsh former professional footballer.

Early life

Lloyd was born in Llanidloes.

Career

An attacking full-back, Lloyd began his career playing in the Welsh Premier League with Caersws. His performances persuaded Hereford United to bring him to Edgar Street in November 1994 and he quickly established himself in the side. However a spate of injuries in his second year meant he struggled to make regular appearances and was released at the end of the season.

He instead signed for Cardiff City where he again broke into the first team squad, scoring his first and only goal for the club with a lob against Carlisle United. The following season he was struck by another injury, this time due to a severe back injury which restricted him to just four appearances all season and led to his release by the club at the end of the 1997–98 season, although he was allowed to train with the side during the summer in order to retain fitness. After an unsuccessful trial at Oldham Athletic, Lloyd returned to his first club Caersws. After one season at Caersws, he joined Bath City but was forced to retire in 2001 due to continued back problems.

References

External links

Welsh Premier profile

1970 births
Living people
People from Llanidloes
Sportspeople from Powys
Welsh footballers
Association football defenders
Caersws F.C. players
Hereford United F.C. players
Cardiff City F.C. players
Bath City F.C. players
Cymru Premier players
English Football League players
Southern Football League players